Lataxiena fimbriata is a species of sea snail, a marine gastropod mollusc in the family Muricidae, the murex snails or rock snails.

Description

Distribution
The type species was found in the Makassar Strait, Indonesia.

References

 Leung KF. & Morton B. (2003). Effects of long-term anthropogenic perturbations on three subtidal epibenthic molluscan communities in Hong Kong. In: Morton B, editor. Proceedings of an International Workshop Reunion Conference, Hong Kong: Perspectives on Marine Environment Change in Hong Kong and Southern China, 1977–2001. Hong Kong University Press, Hong Kong. pp 655–717.
 Liu, J.Y. [Ruiyu] (ed.). (2008). Checklist of marine biota of China seas. China Science Press. 1267 pp.

External links
 MNHN, Paris: syntype
 Hinds, R. B. (1844-1845). Mollusca. In: The zoology of the voyage of H. M. S. "Sulphur", under the command of Captain Sir Edward Belcher, R. N., C. B., F. R. G. S., etc., during the years 1836-42. London: Smith, Elder and Co. v + 72 pp., 21 pls.
 Sowerby, G. B., III. (1894). Descriptions of twelve new species, chiefly from Mauritius. Proceedings of the Malacological Society of London. 1(2): 41-44, pl. 4
 Jousseaume, F., 1883. Description d'espèces et de genres nouveaux de mollusques. Bulletin de la Société Zoologique de France 8: 186-204

fimbriata
Gastropods described in 1844